Radětice is the name of the following places in the Czech Republic:

 Radětice (Příbram District), a village in Příbram District, Central Bohemian Region
 Radětice (Tábor District), a village in Tábor District, South Bohemian Region